Trigonopterus nitidulus is a species of flightless weevil in the genus Trigonopterus from Indonesia.

Description 
Trigonopterus nitidulus was described in a journal in March 2019. It is native to Indonesia.

References 

Beetles described in 2019
Insects of Indonesia
nitidulus
Beetles of Asia
Endemic fauna of Indonesia